Said Achtouk (1925 – September 7, 1989) was a Moroccan singer, poet (ṛṛays) and songwriter. He wrote and sang in Tashelhit.

Biography 
Said Bizrane or Achtouk was born in the village of Bizourane, part of Idaou-Bouzia which is one of the renowned tribes of Chtouka. Thus, his artistic name Achtouk which means "from Chtouka" in Tachelhit.

He started singing and writing poems early in life while participating in traditional dancing celebrations called Ajmak. He was inspired by many Shilha artists such as Lhaj Belaid, Anchad and Boudraa.

His professional career started officially when he met Ahmed Amentag in 1958 after which he founded his musical band including artists such as Fatima Tabaamrant and Rkia Damsiria.

Achtouk died on September 7, 1989 in Rabat.

Legacy 
Said Achtouk wrote several songs treating several social, cultural and political topics. Some of his famous poems and songs are:

 A yamarg
 Diaman
 A llayhnik
 Likamt
 Lawsaf n zin
 Tamadont
 Rwah anmon

The cultural center in Biougra is named after him for his contributions to art and culture locally and nationally.

Private life 
Said Achtouk was married and the father of Mohamed Bizrane, a famous Moroccan surgeon, specialized in urology and sports medicine. He was a football enthusiast and president of Biougra football club.

See also 
 Omar Wahrouch
 Mohamed Demsiri

External links
 Actual Performance Video

References 

1925 births
1989 deaths
20th-century Moroccan poets
20th-century Moroccan male singers
Berber musicians
Berber poets
Moroccan songwriters
Moroccan writers
Shilha people